Liu Lingling (born 8 November 1994) is a Chinese trampoline gymnast.

Liu was born in Fuzhou, China. She started trampoline gymnastics at age five and joined the national team in 2009.

Career
At the 2014 Trampoline World Championships, Liu won gold medals in the individual and synchro events.

At the 2015 Trampoline World Championships, she won the gold medal in the team event and the silver medal in the individual event.

At the 2017 Trampoline Gymnastics World Championships, she won, alongside Zhong Xingping and Zhu Xueying, the gold medal in the team event.

At the 2018 Asian Games, she won the gold medal in the women's trampoline event.

At the 2020 Summer Olympics, she won the silver medal in the women's trampoline event.

References

External links

1994 births
Living people
Sportspeople from Fuzhou
Chinese female trampolinists
Gymnasts at the 2018 Asian Games
Medalists at the 2018 Asian Games
Asian Games gold medalists for China
Asian Games medalists in gymnastics
Medalists at the Trampoline Gymnastics World Championships
Gymnasts at the 2020 Summer Olympics
Medalists at the 2020 Summer Olympics
Olympic gymnasts of China
Olympic silver medalists for China
Olympic medalists in gymnastics
21st-century Chinese women